Presidential elections were held in Kiribati on 25 February 2003. The result was a victory for incumbent President Teburoro Tito, who received 50.4% of the vote. However, Tito was removed from office following a vote of no confidence in the House of Assembly in March 2003, and fresh elections were held in July.

Results

References

Kiribati
2003 02
2003 in Kiribati
2003